Charles Legge (September 29, 1829 – April 12, 1881) was a Canadian civil engineer and patent solicitor.

External links 
 Biography at the Dictionary of Canadian Biography Online

Canadian civil engineers
1829 births
1881 deaths